Vivian Sumner Simpson MC (1883 – 13 April 1918) was an English amateur footballer who played in the Football League for The Wednesday as a forward. He is most notable for his time in non-League football with Sheffield, for whom he scored over 100 goals in over 200 appearances.

Personal life 
Simpson attended Wesley College, Sheffield and later worked for his father as a solicitor. He served in the York and Lancaster Regiment during the First World War and was awarded the Military Cross and mentioned in dispatches in September 1917:

Between November 1916 and February 1917, Simpson was promoted from a temporary second lieutenant to acting captain, while commanding his company. He was promoted to acting captain and to command his company again in April 1917. In September 1917, Simpson was invalided back to Britain after suffering wounds and was posted to a role training junior officers in Sunderland. He later returned to the front and was killed by a sniper "while selflessly dashing through the darkness to check on his comrades" on 13 April 1918 at Outtersteene, near Ploegsteert, Belgium. He was buried in Outtersteene Communal Cemetery Extension.

Honours 
Sheffield
 FA Amateur Cup: 1903–04

Career statistics

References

1883 births
1918 deaths
Footballers from Sheffield
English footballers
English Football League players
Association football inside forwards
British Army personnel of World War I
York and Lancaster Regiment officers
British military personnel killed in World War I
Sheffield F.C. players
Sheffield Wednesday F.C. players
Norwich City F.C. players
Northern Nomads F.C. players
Southern Football League players
Deaths by firearm in Belgium

English solicitors
People educated at Wesley College, Sheffield